Gusheh-ye Sofla (also Romanized as Gūsheh-ye Soflá; also known as Gūsheh Pā’īn and Gūsheh-ye Pā’īn) is a village in Enaj Rural District, Qareh Chay District, Khondab County, Markazi Province, Iran. At the 2006 census, its population was 181, in 38 families.

References 

Populated places in Khondab County